"The Lover in You" is the second and final single released from Big Daddy Kane's fourth studio album, Prince of Darkness. Produced by Big Daddy Kane himself, the song used a sample of Prince's 1985 hit "Pop Life", for which Prince is credited as a writer. It is based on an earlier rap of the same title by the Sugarhill Gang.

A remixed version samples the Loose Ends song "Hanging on a String", but it also reuses the original's synthesizer intro.

Though it did not reach the Billboard Hot 100, the song was a hit on the R&B charts, peaking at number 26.

Single track listing

A-Side
"The Lover in You" (Album Version) – 4:19
"The Lover in You" (Mr Cee's Remix) – 4:07
"The Lover in You" (Mr Cee's Remix Instrumental) – 4:08

B-Side
"Git Bizzy" (Album Version) – 3:33
"Get Down" (Remix) – 4:16
"Get Down" (Remix Instrumental) – 4:16

Chart history

1992 singles
Big Daddy Kane songs
Songs written by Prince (musician)
1991 songs
Songs written by Big Daddy Kane
Warner Records singles
Cold Chillin' Records singles